Jean Carlos Blanco (born 6 April 1992) is a Colombian footballer who plays as a forward.

Career
On 14 December 2017, Blanco signed a long-term contract with Bulgarian side CSKA Sofia.  He was released at the end of the 2017–18 season.

On 7 July 2018, Blanco signed with Independiente Medellín.

Career statistics

References

External links
 

1992 births
Living people
People from Norte de Santander Department
Colombian footballers
Colombia youth international footballers
Colombian expatriate footballers
Cúcuta Deportivo footballers
Atlético Huila footballers
Deportes Tolima footballers
La Equidad footballers
PFC CSKA Sofia players
Independiente Medellín footballers
Once Caldas footballers
Unión Magdalena footballers
Boyacá Chicó F.C. footballers
FC Ilves players
Categoría Primera A players
First Professional Football League (Bulgaria) players
Veikkausliiga players
Colombian expatriate sportspeople in Bulgaria
Expatriate footballers in Bulgaria
Colombian expatriate sportspeople in Finland
Expatriate footballers in Finland
Association football forwards